Anders Thunborg (1934–December 2004) was a Swedish social democratic politician and diplomat. He served as the defense minister between 1983 and 1985. He was also Swedish ambassador to the United Nations, Moscow, Washington and the Vatican City. He was one of the senior experts on Nordic security.

Biography
Thunborg was born in 1934. In the 1950s he was a motorcycle racer.

He was state secretary at the Ministry of Defense between 1969 and 1974. Then he was named as the Sweden's ambassador to the United Nations which he held until 1983 when he was appointed minister of defense to the second cabinet of Olof Palme. Thunborg replaced Borje Andersson who resigned from the post on 2 December 1983. Thunborg resigned from office in 1985. The reason for his resignation was the remarks by Foreign Minister Lennart Bodström about the Swedish military force.

Thunborg's next post was ambassador to the Soviet Union which he served between 1986 and 1989. Then he was appointed Swedish ambassador to the United States and was in office until 25 January 1993 when he was replaced by Henrik Liljegren in the post. He served as the Swedish ambassador to the Vatican City State in 1996. Next Thunborg was named as the Swedish ambassador to Greece in 1997. It was his last diplomatic post which he could hold just for a few months because of asthma problems.

In addition to his diplomatic service Thunborg was the chairman of the Swedish Motorcycle Association. He published several articles in Finnish international relations magazine Ulkopolitiikka.

Personal life and death
His wife was Ingalill Thunborg. Anders Thunborg died in December 2004.

References

20th-century Swedish politicians
1934 births
2004 deaths
Ambassadors of Sweden to Greece
Ambassadors of Sweden to the Holy See
Ambassadors of Sweden to the Soviet Union
Ambassadors of Sweden to the United States
Cold War diplomats
Permanent Representatives of Sweden to the United Nations
Politicians from Stockholm
Swedish Ministers for Defence
Swedish Social Democratic Party politicians
Swedish motorcycle racers
Security experts